Rivarone is a comune (municipality) in the Province of Alessandria in the Italian region Piedmont, located about  east of Turin and about  northeast of Alessandria. The municipality has a population of 402 residents based on the 2020 Census.

Rivarone borders the following municipalities: Alluvioni Piovera, Bassignana and Montecastello.

References

Cities and towns in Piedmont